Millingen aan de Rijn is a former municipality and a town in the eastern Netherlands, in the municipality of Berg en Dal (formerly known as Groesbeek).

References

External links

Municipalities of the Netherlands disestablished in 2015
Former municipalities of Gelderland
Populated places in Gelderland
Geography of Berg en Dal (municipality)